Seva is a municipality in the comarca of Osona in Catalonia, Spain. The municipality includes a large exclave to the south-west.

References

External links
 Government data pages 

Municipalities in Osona